Banwell is a surname. In some rare cases, it may be spelled Banewell. Notable people with the surname include:

Martin Banwell (born 1954), New Zealand chemist
Mike Banwell (born 1987), Canadian ice hockey player
Tex Banwell (1917–1999), British soldier